The 37th Golden Globe Awards, honoring the best in film and television for 1979, were held on 26 January 1980.

Winners

Film

Television

Best Series - Drama
 Lou Grant
Backstairs at the White House
Centennial 
Dallas
Roots: The Next Generations 
The Rockford Files

Best Series - Comedy or Musical
 Alice (tie)
 Taxi (tie)  
M*A*S*H
The Love Boat
The Associates

Best Motion Picture Made for Television
 All Quiet on the Western Front
Elvis
Friendly Fire
Like Normal People
The Miracle Worker

Best Actor – Drama Series
 Ed Asner – Lou Grant
Richard Chamberlain – Centennial
Erik Estrada – CHiPs
James Garner – The Rockford Files
John Houseman – The Paper Chase
Martin Sheen – Blind Ambition
Robert Urich – Vega$
Robert Wagner – Hart to Hart

Best Actress – Drama Series
 Natalie Wood – From Here to Eternity
Barbara Bel Geddes – Dallas
Kate Mulgrew – Mrs. Columbo
Stefanie Powers – Hart to Hart
Sada Thompson – Family

Best Actor – Comedy or Musical Series
 Alan Alda – M*A*S*H
Judd Hirsch – Taxi
Wilfrid Hyde-White – The Associates
John Ritter – Three's Company
Robin Williams – Mork & Mindy

Best Actress – Comedy or Musical Series
 Linda Lavin – Alice
Penny Marshall – Laverne & Shirley
Donna Pescow – Angie
Jean Stapleton – All in the Family
Loretta Swit – M*A*S*H

Best Supporting Actor
 Danny DeVito – Taxi (tie) 
 Vic Tayback – Alice (tie)
Jeff Conaway – Taxi
Tony Danza – Taxi
David Doyle – Charlie's Angels

Best Supporting Actress
 Polly Holliday – Alice
Loni Anderson – WKRP in Cincinnati
Marilu Henner – Taxi
Beth Howland – Alice
Linda Kelsey – Lou Grant

See also
52nd Academy Awards
31st Primetime Emmy Awards
32nd Primetime Emmy Awards
 33rd British Academy Film Awards
 34th Tony Awards
 1979 in film
 1979 in television

References
IMdb 1980 Golden Globe Awards

037
1979 film awards
1979 television awards
January 1980 events in the United States
Golden Globe